Hugo Silva may refer to:

 Hugo Silva (actor), born 1977
 Hugo Silva (footballer, born 1988), footballer/manager
 Hugo Silva (footballer, born 1992), footballer